Pogobie Średnie  is a village in the administrative district of Gmina Pisz, within Pisz County, Warmian-Masurian Voivodeship, in northern Poland. The village is located on the shore of the Pogubie Wielkie Lake.

References

Villages in Pisz County